is a former Japanese football player. Seira Miyazawa, his daughter, is a former member of female idol group Nogizaka46.

Playing career
Miyazawa was born in Chiba Prefecture on July 14, 1963. After graduating from Kokushikan University, he joined Fujita Industries in 1986. He became a regular player as center back from first season. The club won the 2nd place 1988 Emperor's Cup. In 1992, he moved to his local club JEF United Ichihara. He played many matches as center back. However his opportunity to play decreased in 1995 and he retired at the end of the 1995 season.

Club statistics

References

External links

Profile

1963 births
Living people
Kokushikan University alumni
Association football people from Chiba Prefecture
French footballers
Japanese footballers
Japan Soccer League players
J1 League players
Shonan Bellmare players
JEF United Chiba players
Japanese people of French descent
Naturalized citizens of Japan
Association football defenders